Western Luck is a 1924 American silent Western film directed by George Beranger and starring Buck Jones, Beatrice Burnham, Pat Hartigan, Thomas G. Lingham, J. Farrell MacDonald and Edith Kennick. Written by Robert N. Lee, the film was released on June 22, 1924, by Fox Film Corporation.

Cast       
 Buck Jones as Larry Campbell 
 Beatrice Burnham as Betty Gray
 Pat Hartigan as James Evart
 Thomas G. Lingham as Lem Pearson 
 J. Farrell MacDonald as 'Chuck' Campbell
 Edith Kennick as Mrs. Pearson
 Bruce Gordon as Leonard Pearson

References

External links
 

1924 films
1924 Western (genre) films
Fox Film films
Films directed by George Beranger
American black-and-white films
Silent American Western (genre) films
1920s English-language films
1920s American films